The 2017 Men's Ice Hockey World Championships was the 81st such event hosted by the International Ice Hockey Federation. Teams participated at several levels of competition. The competition also served as qualifications for division placements in the 2018 competition.

Championship (Top Division)

The tournament was held in Cologne, Germany and Paris, France from 5 to 21 May 2017.

Division I

Group A
The tournament was held in Kyiv, Ukraine from 22 to 28 April 2017.

Group B
The tournament was held in Belfast, United Kingdom from 23 to 29 April 2017.

Division II

Group A
The tournament was held in Galați, Romania from 3 to 9 April 2017.

Group B
The tournament was held in Auckland, New Zealand from 4 to 10 April 2017.

Division III

The tournament was held in Sofia, Bulgaria from 10 to 16 April 2017.  At the September 2016 IIHF congress it was decided to change the format so that there would be a single tournament in Bulgaria.

References

External links
IIHF Official Website

 
World Ice Hockey Championships, Men's
IIHF Men's World Ice Hockey Championships